Philippe Rougé-Thomas (born 1 August 1961) was a French rugby union player who was capped 2 times. He played for France.

Rougé-Thomas played as Fly-half for the Stade Toulousain where he won 4 French Championship. With France he played 2 match against the All Blacks in 1989. After  his retirement he became backs coach of Stade Toulousain.

Honours 
 Selected to represent France, 1989
 French Championship 1985, 1986, 1989 and 1994
 Challenge Yves du Manoir 1988, 1993

External links 
 ESPN profile

Living people
French rugby union players
France international rugby union players
1961 births
Rugby union fly-halves
French rugby union coaches
Stade Toulousain players
Sportspeople from Hautes-Pyrénées